"Close" is a song co-written and recorded by Canadian country artist Jade Eagleson. He co-wrote the track with Gavin Slate and Travis Wood, as well as the track's producer Todd Clark.  It was the fourth single from Eagleson's debut studio album Jade Eagleson.

Background
Eagleson remarked that "A little piece of my heart went into writing this song. It describes the kind of love that changes your world, the type of love that when you find it, you know nothing can make you feel the way it does".

Live performance
Eagleson performed "Close" on ET Canada and the CCMA Foundation's "Canada Together: In Concert" event in April 2020, during the COVID-19 pandemic.

Commercial performance
"Close" reached a peak of number eight on the Billboard Canada Country chart for the week of October 24, 2020, giving Eagleson his fourth consecutive top ten hit to start his career. It also reached #88 on the Canadian Hot 100, and was certified Gold by Music Canada.

Music video
The official music video for "Close" premiered on June 8, 2020.

Credits and personnel
Credits adapted from AllMusic. 

 Jade Eagleson – lead vocals, backing vocals, songwriting
 Todd Clark — backing vocals, production, engineering, guitar, keyboard, programming, songwriting
 Owen Lewis - editing, engineering
 Tony Lucido – bass guitar
 Andrew Mendelson – master engineering
 Justin Niebank - mixing
 Justin Ostrander – guitar
 Jerry Roe – drums
 Justin Schipper – banjo, steel guitar, mandolin
 Gavin Slate – backing vocals, guitar, programming, songwriting
 Travis Wood – backing vocals, songwriting

Charts

Certifications

References

2020 songs
2020 singles
Jade Eagleson songs
Universal Music Canada singles
Songs written by Jade Eagleson
Songs written by Todd Clark
Songs written by Gavin Slate
Songs written by Travis Wood (songwriter)
Song recordings produced by Todd Clark
Song recordings produced by Gavin Slate